WayHome Music and Arts festival is produced by Republic Live and owned by Stan and Eva Dunford. It is a three-day music and arts festival held at the custom-designed camping festival grounds, Burl's Creek Event Grounds. The festival offers multiple stages, a variety of late-night spectacles and experiences, international and local cuisine, an on-site locally produced farmers market, original art installations (past artists include DoLab and Angus Watt), and more than 40,000 fans over the course of the weekend.

WayHome Music & Arts was awarded the New Kid on the Block (Best New Festival) award at the Canadian Music Week Industry Awards, was nominated for Major Festival of the Year at the 2016 Canadian Music Week Industry Awards, and won Major Music Festival of the Year at the 2017 Canadian Music Week Industry Awards. The 2017 edition of WayHome Music & Arts took place from July 28 to 30, 2017.

On September 5, 2017, Republic Live announced the festival will be taking a "pause".  Although this statement informed people that the festival will be on hold for 2018, it provided no insight as to what year the festival will return.

History 

Owned by Stan and Eva Dunford, WayHome Music & Arts was first held in 2015 at Burl's Creek Event Grounds. In its inaugural year, WayHome featured headliners Neil Young, Sam Smith, Kendrick Lamar, along with Alt-J, Modest Mouse, Hozier and many more. In its second year, WayHome Music and Arts 2016 featured LCD Soundsystem, Arcade Fire and The Killers, in addition to performances by Major Lazer, M83, HAIM, Metric, Chvrches, Ray LaMontagne, and 60+ more artists.

Camping 

WayHome Music & Arts is held at the custom-designed festival grounds, Burl's Creek Event Grounds in Oro-Medonte, Ontario. The grounds provide a one-of-a-kind on-site camping experience for fans. The festival offers a range of different camping offerings from tent camping, RV, hydro RV, and quiet camping. The campgrounds come equipped with toilets, showers and feature a general store.

Art and Food 

WayHome Music & Arts takes pride in expanding their immersive festival experience beyond music and incorporate different aspects of food and art. Each year, visual and creative artists are selected to create pieces for the festivals. Past artists include Do LaB, Angus Watt, Aaron Li-Hill, Charles Bierk, Trevor Wheatley and Cosmo Dean, Nathan Whitford, Balloon Chain, Lady AIKO, Diana Lynn VanderMeulen, and many more. WayHome Music & Arts offers a variety of local and international food vendors over the course of the weekend in both the main entertainment area and campgrounds.

2015 line-up

July 24
Neil Young, Alt-J, Hozier, The Decemberists, Girl Talk, Future Islands, The Gaslight Anthem, Hey Rosetta!, G-Eazy, Courtney Barnett, Fucked Up, Thousand Foot Krutch, Delta Spirit, Rhiannon Giddens,  Lukas Nelson & Promise of the Real, Viet Cong, Com Truise, Dwayne Gretzky, Slow Magic, Bear Mountain, Lowell, For Esmé, Saxsyndrum, The Huaraches,  Cross Dog,  MacArthur Clark

July 25
Kendrick Lamar, Modest Mouse, Bassnectar, Run the Jewels,  ODESZA, Sylvan Esso, Danny Brown, Manchester Orchestra, The Rural Alberta Advantage, Big K.R.I.T., Timber Timbre, The Lone Bellow, Django Django, The Growlers, METZ, Alvvays, How to Dress Well, SZA, Broncho, The Highest Order, Dear Rouge, Kevin Garrett, The Beaches, Tomi Swick, Teen Violence, Broken Social Scene (replaced Passion Pit, due to illness)

July 26
Sam Smith, Brandon Flowers, St. Vincent, Vance Joy, The Sheepdogs, Walk the Moon, Kaytranada, Cold War Kids, July Talk, Yukon Blonde, Sloan, Broods, Chad VanGaalen, Evening Hymns, Highs, Brave Shores, Weaves, The Ascot Royals, Zorch, Amos the Transparent, Lost Cousins

2016 line-up

July 22
Headliner: LCD Soundsystem

Metric, CHVRCHES, Gary Clark, Jr., Mac DeMarco, Rae Sremmurd, Wolf Parade, Foals, Nathaniel Rateliff & The Night Sweats, Matt and Kim, Tory Lanez, Keys N Krates, AlunaGeorge, Unknown Mortal Orchestra, The Struts, Femi Kuti & The Positive Force, Shad, FIDLAR (cancelled due to illness), Tourist, Marian Hill, Bombino, LANY, White Lung, BRAIDS, River Tiber, Tennyson.

July 23
Headliner: Arcade Fire

Major Lazer, M83, FKA twigs, Chet Faker, Arkells, The Last Shadow Puppets, Kurt Vile & The Violators, Third Eye Blind, X Ambassadors, Bahamas, A Tribe Called Red, Half Moon Run, Phosphorescent, BADBADNOTGOOD, Patrick Watson, Vince Staples, Savages, GoldLink (cancelled due to "logistical issues"), Lindsey Stirling, Noah Gundersen, Banners, Young Empires, Mothers, Little Scream, Boom Forest.

July 24
Headliner: The Killers.

HAIM, Ray LaMontagne, Beirut, Stars, The Arcs, Glass Animals, BØRNS, MØ, Lucius, Oh Wonder, Robert DeLong, Coleman Hell, White Denim, Black Mountain, Dilly Dally, All Them Witches, Bishop Briggs, The Paper Kites, Allie X.

2017 line-up
Friday, July 28

Saturday, July 29

Sunday, July 30

See also
List of festivals in Ontario

References

External links

2015 establishments in Ontario
Music festivals in Ontario
Music festivals established in 2015
Electronic music festivals in Canada
Pop music festivals in Canada
Rock festivals in Canada
Indie rock festivals